Gagea flavonutans is an Asian species of plants in the lily family, native to Tibet, Nepal, Sikkim, Bhutan, and Assam.

Gagea flavonutans is a bulb-forming perennial up to 25 cm tall. Flowers are yellow with purple veins. It grows in thickets and meadows at elevations of 4000–5000 m.

References

External links

flavonutans
Flora of Asia
Plants described in 1974